Jerzy Wójcik may refer to:
 Jerzy Wójcik (fencer)
 Jerzy Wójcik (cinematographer)